Eger's long-fingered bat (Miniopterus egeri) is a species of long-fingered bat found in Madagascar.

Taxonomy
Eger's long-fingered bat was described as a new species in 2011 by Goodman et al. The eponym for the species name "egeri" is Judith Eger, Senior Curator of Royal Ontario Museum's Department of Mammalogy.

Description
Individuals weigh .

Range and status
Eger's long-fingered bat is endemic to Madagascar. As of 2017, it is evaluated as a least-concern species by the IUCN.

References

Bats of Africa
Mammals of Madagascar
Endemic fauna of Madagascar
Mammals described in 2011